Maksim Gussev (born 20 July 1994) is an Estonian professional footballer who plays as a winger for Nõmme Kalju.

Club career
Gussev joined Legion Football Academy in 2006 and made his first-team debut in 2010. In 2013, he signed with Flora and made his Meistriliiga debut on 9 March 2013 against Paide Linnameeskond.
He went on loan to Finnish club KPV in 2019.

International career
Gussev made his international debut for the Estonia national football team on 9 June 2015 against Finland. He scored his first international goal in his second match on 11 November 2015 against Georgia in a friendly.

International goals
Scores and results list Estonia's goal tally first.

Honours

Club
Flora
 Meistriliiga: 2015
Estonian Cup: 2012–13, 2015–16
Estonian Supercup: 2014, 2016

References

External links

1994 births
Living people
Sportspeople from Narva
Estonian footballers
Estonian people of Russian descent
Association football wingers
Estonia international footballers
Esiliiga players
Meistriliiga players
Veikkausliiga players
Ykkönen players
FC Flora players
FC Puuma Tallinn players
Kokkolan Palloveikot players
Myllykosken Pallo −47 players
Tallinna JK Legion players
Estonian expatriate footballers
Expatriate footballers in Finland
Estonian expatriate sportspeople in Finland
Estonia under-21 international footballers